Annals of Neurology is a peer-reviewed medical journal publishing articles of "broad interest in neurology, particularly those with high impact in understanding the mechanisms and treatment of diseases of the human nervous system." The journal has a 2020 Journal Citation Reports impact factor of 10.422, ranking it 9th out of 208 journals in the category "Clinical Neurology".

History 
The Annals of Neurology was launched in 1977.

Editors
The following people have been editors-in-chief of the journal:
 Clifford B. Saper, 2018present
 Steven L. Hauser, 2006–2013
 Richard T. Johnson, 1997–2005
 Robert A. Fishman, 1993–1997
 Arthur K. Asbury, 1985–1992
 Fred Plum, 1977–1984

References

External links 
 

Publications established in 1977
Neurology journals
Wiley (publisher) academic journals